Toyen are a Czech rock group named after the Czech painter Toyen.

The band formed in 1989 by three members of the new-wave band Letadlo. Having been banned from performing by the Communist Party of Czechoslovakia in the early 1980s, Toyen would form only shortly after the Velvet Revolution. Although the band's compositions are predominantly in Czech, the pieces are occasionally performed in English.

Members
Petr Chromovský – lead vocal, rhythmic guitar & keyboard
Ivo Heger (composer) – lead guitar
Petr Václavek (lyricist) – bass guitar
Jiří Šimeček (founding member/graphic designer) – percussion

Conversing with Industry Professionals
Scott Murphy of 'US-NYC', and marketing supervisor at ABC-TV, witnessed the act’s performances while frequenting Prague clubs/music events, with Murphy eventually deciding to collaborate with the group in preparation for their first US tour, starting production of their first 'EP': "The Following - The Disappeared Rail-Roads". The singles from this album performed favourably on Czech charts. The compositions were characterized as; "mid-tempo, blues-rooted, granting feelings of nostalgia with charming melodies and sophisticated elements of guitar". The physical copies of the EP featured a cover with photography by Tono Stano - and is supposedly still considered a "collectible rarity".

Members of Toyen were also able to converse with Paul King' of MTV's 120 Minutes (UK) at a music competition in Bregenz. King would feature live-footage of the band in Prague, recorded by David Ondricek in the episode of 120 Minutes.

International Acknowledgements
Toyen started their US tour at the Broadway club, The Shooting Gallery, with a subsequent performance at CBGB.

The band would go on to sign a record deal with Czech label 'Sony Music - Bonton'. Allowing the studio-production of their follow-up album; "Last Free Swans!", which was written in collaboration with producer Colin Stuart and featured lyrics by London's, Matt Black. This albumfeatured a "stronger psychedelic/groovy vibe", in comparison to the act's previous release. 

Toyen were invited to Wales to perform the 'Open-Air Summer Festival  in Cardiff, as well as being invited to do a performance in Austria that same year.

British electronic act Depeche Mode took Toyen on as a support-act for the Prague performance of their 'Devotion Tour, in 1993.

Later Achievements
Lead-guitarist Ivo Heger left the act in the years following their US tour, causing grief amongst fans. Heger went on to create his own project; 'The Way', as Toyen had signed a new agreement with 'BMG CZ'.

Scott Murphy has prepared a new US tour for the act, respective of their new agreement. Replacing their guitarist with original member; Jiri Simecek. All though Simecek supposedly did not hold compositional abilities on par with Heger, the issue seemingly had little to no effect on Toyen's continuation.

Toyen prepared a new album "Blue Painter" (or "Malíř Smutnej" in Czech), for 'BMG CZ'. Which was produced in collaboration with Jan P. Muchow.

Hiatus/Retirement
Křivka announced his retiral after Toyen's second US tour ("Blue Painter"s promotional tour), with his replacement, František Sahula.

Toyen released their last album with new guitarist, Petr Vana; "La Orana", in 1997 - under an independent CZ label. It featured new compositions in English, in attempt to cater toward a Western audience (like their earlier live-performances). The last two tracks of the album paying homage to original member Heger, featuring his guitar/keyboard.

When Šimeček was made aware of "La Orana" being the project's last album, he attempted to conclude it with a spoken-word track about Toyen's history. This however did not come to fruition. 

The band's last performances were held in their hometown, each with declining attendance. Ondříček produced a movie about Toyen, which aired on Czech TV in 1997.

References 

Czech rock music groups
1989 establishments in Czechoslovakia
Musical groups established in 1989